Heorhiy Dybenko (born 1928) is a Soviet former athlete. He competed in the men's hammer throw at the 1952 Summer Olympics.

References

External links
 

1928 births
Possibly living people
Athletes (track and field) at the 1952 Summer Olympics
Soviet male hammer throwers
Olympic athletes of the Soviet Union
Place of birth missing (living people)